The 1893–94 Chicago Maroons men's basketball team represented the University of Chicago in intercollegiate basketball and served as the first team in the history of the university. The team finished the season with a 6–1 record The team played their home games on campus in the Men's Gymnasium.

The team consisted of 9 players; Henry David Hubbard, Henry Magee Adkinson, Sidney Charles Liebenstein, Charles King Bliss, Stanley M. Ramsay, William B. Keen Jr., Clifford Bottsford McGillivray, Frederick Day Nichols, and Harry Victor Church. The Maroons did not have a head coach listed on their roster, however, Hubbard was appointed team captain.

Roster 

Source

Schedule
Source									

|-	

|- align="center" bgcolor=""

|- align="center" bgcolor=""

	

	

|- align="center" bgcolor=""

|-

References

External links
 

Chicago Maroons men's basketball seasons
Chicago Maroons Men's Basketball Team
Chicago Maroons Men's Basketball Team
Chicago